German submarine U-3004 was a Type XXI U-boat (one of the "Elektroboote") of Nazi Germany's Kriegsmarine, built for service in World War II. She was ordered on 6 November 1943, and was laid down on 4 June 1944 at AG Weser, Bremen as yard number 1163. She was launched on 26 July 1944, and commissioned under the command of Kapitänleutnant Helmut Thurmann on 30 August 1944.

Design
Like all Type XXI U-boats, U-3004 had a displacement of  when at the surface and  while submerged. The submarine was powered by two MAN SE supercharged six-cylinder M6V40/46KBB diesel engines each providing , two Siemens-Schuckert GU365/30 double-acting electric motors each providing , and two Siemens-Schuckert silent running GV232/28 electric motors each providing .

U-3004 was fitted with six  torpedo tubes in the bow and four  C/30 anti-aircraft guns. She could carry twenty-three torpedoes or seventeen torpedoes and twelve mines. The complement was five officers and fifty-two men.

Fate
U-3004 was buried in Elbe II U-boat pens in Hamburg after German surrender.  and  buried with her also.

Previously recorded fate
U-3004 was scuttled on 2 May 1945, in the Elbe II U-boat pen in Hamburg as part of Operation Regenbogen.

The wreck is located at

References

Bibliography

External links
 

Type XXI submarines
U-boats commissioned in 1944
World War II submarines of Germany
1944 ships
Ships built in Bremen (state)
Operation Regenbogen (U-boat)